The Cedar Grove Transit Station is a transit facility in Eagan, Minnesota. It serves the Minnesota Valley Transit Authority bus system and the Metro Red Line bus rapid transit system. It opened March 20, 2010 in the Cedar Grove community.

The station was built adjacent to Cedar Avenue freeway (Minnesota State Highway 77), but there was not any direct access from the freeway to the station for buses. Red Line Buses had to exit the freeway at Diffley Road, travel up Nicols Road to the station, pick up passengers, then double back along Nicols Road and Diffley Road to get back on the freeway, a maneuver that added five to ten minutes for each trip.

New "in-line" access was designed with a station platform in the freeway median and a pedestrian bridge connecting it to the original station area. The platform layout bears a similarity to the 46th Street station on Interstate 35W in Minneapolis, which is about 11 miles north via the highway. Buses perform a "crossover" maneuver to have left-hand running around the platform, which is necessary since Red Line buses only have doors on the right-hand side. A groundbreaking ceremony for the $15 million station upgrade was held on April 28, 2016, which opened on May 20th, 2017. Despite this upgrade, MVTA buses still exit and enter the freeway at Diffley Road to access the station.

Bus connections

Station notes 
Route 438 operates on-demand service to Blackhawk Park & Ride (for connections to Route 480).Route 440 "V" terminal trips make connections to Metro Transit Route's 22 (Minneapolis/Brooklyn Center) and 515 (Richfield Commons/Southdale Mall) @ VA Medical Center.Route's 491 & 492 trips serve Shakopee and Prior Lake.

 Route 438 (Rahn Road / Cliff Lake Road / Blackhawk / Thomas Center Drive)
 Route 440 (VA Medical Center / Highway 77 - Cedar Ave / Nicols Road / Palomino Hills / County Road 38 / Minnesota Zoo / Johnny Cake Ridge Road / 140th Street Station / Pennock Ave / 147th Street Station / Garret Ave / Southport Shopping Center / Apple Valley Transit Station)
 Route 442 (Mall of America / Palomino Hills / Apple Valley Transit Station / Whitney Drive / Garden View Road / Apple Valley Community Center / Evergreen Drive / Fairview Ridges Hospital / Burnsville Center)
 Route 444 (Mall of America / Highway 13 / Burnsville Transit Station / Travelers Trail / Heart of the City / Burnsville Parkway / County Road 5 / Burnsville Center / County Road 42 / Savage)
 Route 445 (Yankee Doodle Road / Blue Cross Road / Donald Ave / Coachman Oaks / Eagan Transit Station / Duckwood Drive / Eagan Town Center / Thomson Reuters)
 Route 472 (Downtown Minneapolis / Lake Street I-35W Station  / Blackhawk)
 Route 475U (University of Minnesota (Coffman, Anderson, Wiley & Cooke) / Ridder Arena / TCF Bank Stadium / Stadium Village METRO Green Line LRT Station / Downtown Minneapolis / Lake Street I-35W Station / Minnesota Zoo / Apple Valley)
 Route 491A  (Downtown Minneapolis / Lake Street I-35W Station / Southbridge Crossings Park and Ride / Eagle Creek Park and Ride / Dakotah Parkway)
 Route 492  (Downtown Minneapolis / Lake Street I-35W Station / Mystic Lake Casino / Southbridge Crossings Park and Ride)

Gallery

See also 
 Other Transit Facilities

References

External links
 Transit Stations/Park & Ride - MVTA

Bus stations in Minnesota
2010 establishments in Minnesota